Robert "Bob" James Wilson (15 April 1861 – 14 May 1944) was a New Zealand rugby union player who represented New Zealand national side, the All Blacks in 1884, playing in the forward position.

Career 
Known by the nickname "baby" (likely due to him weighing about 60 kilograms while playing in the forwards), Wilson received national honours for the 1884 tour of New South Wales coming out of the now-defunct East Christchurch club. Although he never played a single provincial game in New Zealand. He was selected because of Edward D'Auvergne's withdrawal.

The tour manager, S.E Sleigh described Wilson as "perhaps the youngest player in the team who held his own with the other forwards".

Wilson appeared in six of the nine total matches, in the process scoring two tries.

After the tour Wilson moved to Wellington and joined the Athletic club. He then moved to Queensland, Australia where out of the City club played for the state for two years between 1887 and 1888.

Personal 
Wilson became a telegraph operator and died in Perth, Western Australia in 1944. He lived in the suburb of Subiaco and was buried at Karrakatta Cemetery.

References

New Zealand international rugby union players
New Zealand rugby union players
Rugby union players from Christchurch
1861 births
1944 deaths
Burials at Karrakatta Cemetery
Rugby union forwards